Rostaq Rural District may refer to:
 Rostaq Rural District (Darab County), in Fars province
 Rostaq Rural District (Neyriz County), in Fars province
 Rostaq Rural District (Markazi Province)
 Rostaq Rural District (Razavi Khorasan Province)
 Rostaq Rural District (Ashkezar County), in Yazd province